Robert Santini (born February 17, 1932) is an American former professional basketball player. Santini was selected in the 1953 NBA Draft by the New York Knicks after a collegiate career at Iona. He played in only four games and totaled 11 points, 3 rebounds and 1 assist.

References

External links
 Iona Gaels Hall of Fame entry

1932 births
Living people
American men's basketball players
Basketball players from New York City
Forwards (basketball)
Iona Gaels men's basketball players
New York Knicks draft picks
New York Knicks players
Sportspeople from the Bronx